Attorney General Thornton may refer to:

Robert Y. Thornton (1910–2003), Attorney General of Oregon
Ray Thornton (1928–2016), Attorney General of Arkansas